Zane Alexander James Huett (born May 9, 1997) is an American actor.

Zane is most famous for his featured role on the ABC television series Desperate Housewives playing the role of Parker Scavo, the younger son of Lynette and  Tom Scavo. He plays the youngest Scavo boy, yet is older by six months than the actors Brent Kinsman and Shane Kinsman who play the older Scavo boys. Desperate Housewives is Huett's first role for television.

Other film credits include Mysterious Skin and P.O.V.: The Camera's Eye.

He has a younger sister (Zoe Alexa Julianne Huett) who also acts on occasion.

Zane currently serves as a StarPower Ambassador for Starlight Children's Foundation, encouraging other young people to commit their time, energy and resources to help other kids and working with Starlight to brighten the lives of seriously ill children.

Filmography

Awards

References

External links

1997 births
Living people